Country Hits Old and New is an album by American country singer Ernest Tubb, released in 1966 (see 1966 in music). It is out of print.

Track listing
"Memphis Tennessee" (Chuck Berry)
"Before I Met You" (Charles L. Seitz, Joe Lewis, Elmar Rader)
"Tennessee Waltz" (Pee Wee King, Redd Stewart)
"Fireball Mail" (Floyd Jenkins)
"Under Your Spell Again" (Buck Owens, Dusty Rhodes)
"I'm Gonna Tie One on Tonight" (Lee Nichols)
"Remember Me (When the Candle Lights are Gleaming)" (Scott Wiseman)
"I Hung My Head and Cried" (Jimmie Davis, Cliff Bruner)
"Holdin' Hands" (George Henkel, Tex Fletcher, Viola Gordon)
"No Matter What Happens My Darling" (Johnny Lange, Lou Porter)
"Waitin' in Your Welfare Line" (Buck Owens, Don Rich, Nat Stuckey)
"May the Bird of Paradise Fly Up Your Nose" (Neal Merritt)

Personnel
Ernest Tubb – vocals, guitar
Leon Rhodes – guitar
Jerry Shook – guitar, bass
Cal Smith – guitar
Buddy Charleton – pedal steel guitar
Jack Drake – bass
Jack Greene – drums
Willie Ackerman – drums
Moon Mullican – piano
Jerry Smith – piano

Chart positions

References

Ernest Tubb albums
1966 albums
Albums produced by Owen Bradley
Decca Records albums